Sørkapp (South Cape) is the southernmost point of the island Jan Mayen. The cape is some 455 km east of eastern Greenland, 910 km west northwest of mainland Norway (Lofoten) and 550 km northeast of northeastern Iceland.

References

Headlands of Jan Mayen